John Willard may refer to:

 John Willard (died 1692), American witchcraft defendant
 John Willard (Australian politician) (born 1857), New South Wales politician
 John Willard (judge) (1792–1862), New York lawyer and politician
 John Willard (playwright) (1885–1942), American 
 John D. Willard (1799–1864), New York lawyer and politician

See also